Faisal Al-Husseini International Stadium is an association football stadium on Dahiat al'Barid Street in Al-Ram. It is one of the home stadiums of the Palestine national football team. It is named after Faisal Husseini, a Palestinian politician who died in 2001. The stadium has a seating capacity of 12,500 spectators.

Palestine international matches
On 26 October 2008, the team played Jordan in their first-ever home international in 10 years of FIFA membership. In attendance were FIFA President Sepp Blatter and Palestinian Prime Minister Salam Fayyad. On 29 October 2009, the Palestinian national women's football team played its first home international match against Jordan before a capacity crowd at the stadium.

On 9 March 2011, Palestine "played its first ever competitive match at home in the West Bank". It was the second leg of a qualifier for the 2012 Olympic Games, against Thailand. Thailand had won the first leg 1–0 in Bangkok; Palestine won the second 1–0 at the stadium, with a goal by Abdelhamid Abuhabib in the 43rd minute. The draw on aggregate led to a penalty shootout, with Thailand winning 6–5. Attending the match was Prime Minister Fayyad, who described it as a "historic day".

On 3 July 2011, the stadium hosted "the first World Cup game ever to be played at home in the Palestinian territories". The game was the second leg of a two-match encounter against Afghanistan, in the first round of the Asian Football Confederation qualifiers for the 2014 FIFA World Cup. The game was a draw, enabling Palestine to advance to the second round on aggregate. Afghanistan were eliminated.

References

External links 
  Palestinians make footy history
 Palestine to play 1st match in home stadium

Palestinian territories
Sport in the West Bank
Football venues in the State of Palestine